The 2002 CART Grand Prix of Chicago was the seventh round of the 2002 CART FedEx Champ Car World Series season, held on June 30, 2002 at the Chicago Motor Speedway in Cicero, Illinois, this was the fourth and final running of the event. 26,000 attended the race. Cristiano da Matta of Newman/Haas Racing, the championship leader going into the event, won the race from the third position. Chip Ganassi Racing's Bruno Junqueira finished in second and Team Green driver Dario Franchitti came in third after winning the eleventh pole position of his career in qualifying.

Qualifying results

Race

Caution flags

Notes 

 New Race Record Cristiano da Matta 2:07:00.698
 Average Speed 121.524 mph

References

External links
 Qualifying Results
 Race Results

Chicago